Trifurcula salvifoliae is a moth of the family Nepticulidae. It is found in Spain.

Description 
The larvae feed on Salvia lavandulifolia. They mine the leaves of their host plant. The mine consists of a full-depth, very narrow corridor, hardly widening in the end. The first third is particularly narrow and closely follows the leaf margin. The sides are irregularly scalloped. The frass line is irregular, almost filling the corridor but always leaving clear margins. Pupation takes place outside of the mine. The wingspan of the mature moth is 4.2-4.8 mm.

External links
Seven New Species Of The Subgenus Glaucolepis Braun From Southern Europe (Lepidoptera: Nepticulidae, Trifurcula)
bladmineerders.nl

Nepticulidae
Moths of Europe
Moths described in 2007